Otašević is a Serbian surname. It may refer to:

Nikola Otašević (born 1982), Serbian basketball player
Vladimir Otašević (born 1986), footballer
Momčilo Otašević (born 1990), Montenegrin actor
Dušan Otašević (born 1940), Serbian artist
Đorđe Otašević, Yugoslav basketball player
Ljubica Otašević (1933–1998), Serbian actress and basketball player
Lilly Otasevic (born 1969), Canadian sculptor

Serbian surnames